The Northwest Missouri State Bearcats men's basketball team represents Northwest Missouri State University in Maryville, Missouri, in the NCAA Division II men's basketball competition. The team is currently coached by Ben McCollum, who has been at the helm since 2009. The Bearcats currently compete, and are one of two founding members remaining, of the Mid-America Intercollegiate Athletics Association (MIAA). The basketball team plays its home games in the Bearcat Arena on campus.

National championship games
The men's team in its first national championship appearance in 1932 lost to Henry's Clothiers in the Amateur Athletic Union title game at Convention Hall in Kansas City, Missouri 15–14 in a last second shot. The Bearcat team was coached by Hank Iba.  The featured Bearcat players included Jack McCracken and Wilbur Stalcup.  At the time both corporate-sponsored teams and colleges competed in the same tournament.

The Bearcats played Fairmont State University in the national championship game on March 25, 2017, in Sioux Falls, South Dakota, winning 71–61.

The Bearcats won their second national championship when they played Point Loma Nazarene University in the national championship game on March 30, 2019, in Evansville, Indiana, winning 64-58.

Northwest was ranked #1 in 2020 going into the NCAA Division II men's tournament to defend its title but the tournament was canceled due to the COVID-19 pandemic in the United States.

The Bearcats won their third national championship when they played West Texas A&M in the national championship game on March 27, 2021, in Evansville, Indiana, winning 80-54.

Bearcat Arena

Bearcat Arena has a seating capacity of 2,500. The facility also houses the university's commencement ceremonies, as well professional concerts. Bearcat Arena, formerly known as Lamkin Gymnasium, was built in 1959 and underwent a $6 million renovation during the 1993–94 academic year with additions. The south side received a new face which included a fitness center and coaches' offices on the second floor.

Year-by-year results

Notable players 
  Trevor Hudgins

References

 
Basketball teams established in 1914
1914 establishments in Missouri